Mapulo is an urbanizing barangay in the Upper Pulangi District of Malaybalay, Bukidnon, Philippines. According to the 2015 census, it has a population of 1,260 people.

It is bordered to the north by Caburacanan, to the east by Zamboanguita and Indalasa, to the south by Silae, and to the west by Can-ayan. It was a sitio of Silae until 1960, when Republic Act 3590 was implemented.

References 

Barangays of Malaybalay